Los Morros Airport ,  is an airstrip serving the small Pacific coastal town of Cobquecura, in the Bío Bío Region of Chile.

The runway follows the shoreline. The terrain rises to the east.

See also

Transport in Chile
List of airports in Chile

References

External links
OpenStreetMap - Cobquecura
OurAirports - Los Morros
FallingRain - Los Morros Airport

Airports in Chile
Airports in Ñuble Region